The Most Excellent Order of the Golden Ark is a Dutch order of merit established in 1971 by Prince Bernhard of the Netherlands.  It is awarded to people for major contributions to nature conservation. Although not awarded by the government of the Netherlands, it is considered by the government as a recognized chivalrous order.  Since its inception, over 300 people have been recognised by the award. Now that Prince Bernhard has died, the future of the order is uncertain.

Notable recipients

 Ranjit Bhargava
 Carl Gustav of Sweden
 Gerald Durrell
 Sylvia Earle
Valerie Taylor
 Tony Fitzjohn
 Zafar Futehally
 Jane Goodall
 Gyanendra of Nepal
 Roger Tory Peterson
 Prince Philip, Duke of Edinburgh (awarded 1971)
 Ian Player
 Suman Sahai
 Ravindra Kumar Sinha
 Marc van Roosmalen
 Lyall Watson
 Delia Owens
 Mobutu Sese Seko (awarded 1973)

See also

 List of environmental awards

References

Awards established in 1971
Golden Ark, Order of the
Golden Ark, Order of the
Golden Ark, Order of the